In Greek mythology, the name Hyperochus (Ancient Greek: Ὑπέροχος) may refer to:

Hyperochus, a son of Priam.
Hyperochus, possibly the father of Oenomaus by Sterope.
Hyperochus, a descendant of Magnes, son of Haemon, father of Tenthredon and thus grandfather of Prothous.
Hyperochus, a Hyperborean whose ghost, alongside those of Pyrrhus (Neoptolemus) and a fellow Hyperborean Amadocus (or Laodocus), and possibly that of Phylacus, were believed to have terrorized the Gaul invaders during the historical battle at Delphi.

Hypeirochus (Ὑπείροχος) is a variant of the same name which refers to:

Hypeirochus, a defender of Troy killed by Odysseus; may or may not be the same as the son of Priam.
Hypeirochus, father of Itymoneus; the latter was killed by Nestor in the war between the Pylians and the Eleans.

Notes

References 

 Apollodorus, The Library with an English Translation by Sir James George Frazer, F.B.A., F.R.S. in 2 Volumes, Cambridge, MA, Harvard University Press; London, William Heinemann Ltd. 1921. . Online version at the Perseus Digital Library. Greek text available from the same website.
Gaius Julius Hyginus, Fabulae from The Myths of Hyginus translated and edited by Mary Grant. University of Kansas Publications in Humanistic Studies. Online version at the Topos Text Project.
Homer, The Iliad with an English Translation by A.T. Murray, Ph.D. in two volumes. Cambridge, MA., Harvard University Press; London, William Heinemann, Ltd. 1924. . Online version at the Perseus Digital Library.
 Homer, Homeri Opera in five volumes. Oxford, Oxford University Press. 1920. . Greek text available at the Perseus Digital Library.
 Pausanias, Description of Greece with an English Translation by W.H.S. Jones, Litt.D., and H.A. Ormerod, M.A., in 4 Volumes. Cambridge, MA, Harvard University Press; London, William Heinemann Ltd. 1918. . Online version at the Perseus Digital Library
 Pausanias, Graeciae Descriptio. 3 vols. Leipzig, Teubner. 1903.  Greek text available at the Perseus Digital Library.
 Tzetzes, John, Allegories of the Iliad translated by Goldwyn, Adam J. and Kokkini, Dimitra. Dumbarton Oaks Medieval Library, Harvard University Press, 2015. 

Princes in Greek mythology
Children of Priam
Trojans
People of the Trojan War